Somappa Rayappa Bommai (6 June 1924 – 10 October 2007) was an Indian Politician who was the 4th Chief Minister of Karnataka. He was also the Human Resource Development Minister in the United Front government from 1996 to 1998. He is widely remembered as the champion for the landmark judgment of the Supreme Court of India, S. R. Bommai v. Union of India.

His son Basavaraj Bommai became the Chief Minister of Karnataka in 2021 making them only the second father and son duo after H. D. Devegowda and H. D. Kumaraswamy to become the Chief Ministers of Karnataka. 


Early life and political career
S. R. Bommai was born on 6 June 1924  in a Sadar Lingayat family at Karadagi village of Shiggaon taluk of the then undivided Dharwad District. He took part in the Quit India movement of 1942. He also played an active role in the unification (Ekikarana in Kannada) of Karnataka which had been spread among Mysore kingdom, Bombay Presidency, Hyderabad, and Madras Presidency, during the British rule.

A lawyer by profession, he was elected to the Karnataka Legislative assembly many times from the Hubballi rural constituency and was also a member of the Karnataka Legislative council from 1972 to 1978.

He along with Ramakrishna Hegde, J. H. Patel and H. D. Deve Gowda — was instrumental in the Janata Party forming a government in the State for the first time in the State in 1983.  He was given the weighty portfolio of Industries in the Ramakrishna Hegde government. After Hegde quit on moral grounds, Mr. Bommai took charge as Chief Minister of the State on 13 August 1988 and his government was dismissed by the then Governor, P. Venkatasubbaiah, on 21 April 1989. The dismissal was on the grounds that his government had lost its majority following large-scale defections engineered by several Janata Party leaders of the day. Bommai had sought some time from the Governor to prove his majority on the floor of the Legislature and he was denied this. He challenged this order in the Supreme Court.

S. R. Bommai was the president of Karnataka state unit until the state unit got merged with Janata Dal in 1993 before 1994 Karnataka Assembly elections.

S. R. Bommai v. Union of India case

S. R. Bommai v. Union of India was a landmark judgment of the Supreme Court of India, where the Court discussed at length, the provisions of Article 356 of the Constitution of India and related issues. The apex court spelt out restrictions on the centre's power to dismiss a state government under Article 356.  This case had huge impact on Centre-State Relations. Instances of imposition of President's rule have reduced after this judgement.

Bommai was National president of the Janata Dal from 1990 to 1996. He was elected to the Rajya Sabha, two times in 1992 and 1998.  In 1996, he became the Union minister for Human resource development in the United Front government and served with both the prime ministers H. D. Deve Gowda and I. K. Gujral. In 1999, after the Janata Dal split, he sided with the JD(U) faction and later formed the All India Progressive Janata Dal in 2002, as a platform for merger of different factions of Janata Dal.  However, after large scale defections, the weakened party was finally merged with JD(U).

He died on 10 October 2007, aged 84. His one son, M.S. Bommai is an industrialist in Bengaluru, and the other Basavaraj Bommai inherited his political legacy and went on to become the Chief Minister of Karnataka  on 28 July 2021.

References

1924 births
2007 deaths
People from Haveri district
Rajya Sabha members from Karnataka
Rajya Sabha members from Odisha
Leaders of the Opposition in the Karnataka Legislative Assembly
Chief ministers from Janata Party
Education Ministers of India
Coal Ministers of India
Members of the Cabinet of India
Janata Party politicians
Janata Dal (United) politicians
Janata Dal politicians
Chief Ministers of Karnataka